Sir David Alexander Orr MC* (10 May 1922 in Dalkey, County Dublin – 2 February 2008) was an Anglo-Irish businessman, philanthropist and World War II veteran.

Early years
Orr was born the third of four children to Canon A.W.F. Orr, an Anglican rector at Canon of Christ Church Cathedral. David Orr attended The High School, Dublin and went on to study Classics at Trinity College, Dublin, where he was a boxer and captain of rugby.

World War II
In 1941, he left school to enlist in the Royal Ulster Rifles and was commissioned into the Royal Engineers, serving with Queen Victoria's Own Madras Sappers and Miners during the reconquest of Burma in 1944-45. He was awarded two Military Crosses.

Unilever
After the war, Orr returned to Trinity to complete a degree in Law. He joined Unilever as a graduate trainee. From 1955 to 1966 he was posted to Unilever's India subsidiary, Hindustan Lever. He returned to London before moving to New York to become president of Lever Bros in 1965. He retired in 1982.

Inchcape
Orr later became chairman of Inchcape, a trading group. He also sat on the boards of RTZ and Shell Transport & Trading. From 1983-89, Orr was a member of the court of the Bank of Ireland.

Top Salaries Review
He was a member of Harold Wilson's "committee to review the functioning of financial institutions" (1977–80). Later he served on the Top Salaries Review Body (civil service) and the Armed Forces' Pay Review Body, negotiating directly with then Prime Minister Margaret Thatcher.

Globe Theatre
In 1982, Orr had also been asked to help rebuild the Globe Theatre. As chairman of the Globe Theatre Trust he had been a brilliant fundraiser. The building was finally completed in 1997.

Honours
Orr was knighted in 1977. In 1979, he was appointed a Commander of the Dutch Order of Orange Nassau.

Affiliations
 Chancellor of Queen's University, Belfast
 President, Liverpool School of Tropical Medicine
 President, College of Speech Therapists
 Governor, London School of Economics.
 Chairman, British Council (1985–92)
 Joint Chair, Anglo-Irish Encounter

Sports
A boxer and rugby player, in London he played rugby centre for London Irish, captaining the club in 1951-52; he also had a trial for Ireland.

Personal life
In 1949, he married Phoebe Davis, with whom he had three daughters, all of whom survive Orr, who died in 2008, aged 85, from undisclosed causes.

References

1922 births
2008 deaths
20th-century Anglo-Irish people
British Army personnel of World War II
20th-century British businesspeople
Businesspeople from County Dublin
Chancellors of Queen's University Belfast
Irish Anglicans
20th-century Irish philanthropists
Knights Bachelor
Alumni of Trinity College Dublin
People from Dalkey
Recipients of the Military Cross
Royal Engineers officers
20th-century British philanthropists
People of the British Council
21st-century Irish philanthropists